Spiritus is a 1996 novel by the Albanian writer Ismail Kadare. It marks a narrative and compositional turning point in his literary career. The influence of this novel will be felt in all of Kadare's subsequent novels. It is a novel about the anxiety of wiretapping.

Plot 
A group of foreigners touring Eastern Europe after the fall of communism hears exciting rumours during its stay in Albania about the capture of the spirit from the dead. As it turns out, the spirit is in fact a listening device known to the notorious secret service as a "hornet".

See also
Albanian literature
The Palace of Dreams

References

Bibliography 
 
 

1996 novels
20th-century Albanian novels
Novels by Ismail Kadare
Novels set in Albania
Novels set in the 1960s
Onufri Publishing House books